The Lowcountry (sometimes Low Country or just low country) is a geographic and cultural region along South Carolina's coast, including the Sea Islands. The region includes significant salt marshes and other coastal waterways, making it an important source of biodiversity in South Carolina.

Once known for its slave-based agricultural wealth in rice and indigo, crops that flourished in the hot subtropical climate, the Lowcountry today is known for its historic cities and communities, natural environment, cultural heritage, and tourism industry. The communities in low countries are still heavily dominated by African American communities, such as the Gullah/Geechee people.

Geography

The term "Low Country" originally was all the state below the Fall Line, or the Sandhills which run the width of the state from Aiken County to Chesterfield County. The Sandhills or Carolina Sandhills is a 15–60 km wide region within the Atlantic Coastal Plain province, along the inland margin of this province. The Carolina Sandhills are interpreted as eolian (wind-blown) sand sheets and dunes that were mobilized episodically from approximately 75,000 to 6,000 years ago. Most of the published luminescence ages from the sand are coincident with the last glaciation, a time when the southeastern United States was characterized by colder air temperatures and stronger winds. The area above the Sandhills was known as "Upstate" or "Upcountry". These areas are different in geology, geography, and culture.

There are several variations on the geographic extent of the "Lowcountry" area. The most commonly accepted definition includes the counties of Charleston, Dorchester, Beaufort, Georgetown, Colleton, Hampton, Berkeley, Jasper, and Williamsburg; often described as the area encompassing the basins of Cooper River, Santee River, ACE (Ashepoo-Combahee-Edisto) Basin, Winyah Bay and Savannah River Basin.  Some groups include Marion and Horry into the "Lowcountry" region. Dillon is included in the Lowcounty by the largest group of healthcare executives in the state.  

Four counties are covered by the Lowcountry Council of Governments, a regional governmental entity charged with regional and transportation planning, and are the ones included in the South Carolina Department of Parks, Recreation, and Tourism's "Lowcountry and Resort Islands" area. The area includes the Hilton Head Island-Bluffton-Beaufort, SC Metropolitan Statistical Area.  

Technically, the Lowcountry is synonymous with the areas with a large population of Gullah Geechee peoples of the region. Gullah Geechee people have traditionally resided in the coastal areas and the sea islands of North Carolina, South Carolina, Georgia and Florida — from Pender County, North Carolina, to St. Johns County, Florida.

Tourism 
The tourism industry has been a vibrant part of the regions economy since the beginning of the 20th century. The tourism commission currently advertises both nature-based tourism and historic sites. The pressure of the tourism industry on the coast both encroaches on marshland and places pressure on African American communities.

The industry tends to emphasize the Gullah Geechee cultural tradition as part of the Gullah/Geechee Cultural Heritage Corridor. Important to this cultural tradition are traditional seagrass baskets. However, harvesting the natural seagrass is under pressure from both development and overharvesting.

References

Regions of South Carolina
Gullah country